Aleksandr Lashayevich Verulidze (born 25 September 1996) is a Russian football player. He plays in Georgia for Samgurali Tskhaltubo.

Club career
He made his professional debut in the Russian Cup game for FC SKA-Khabarovsk on 24 August 2016 in a game against FC Sakhalin Yuzhno-Sakhalinsk.

He made his Russian Football National League debut for FC Fakel Voronezh on 30 July 2017 in a game against FC Sibir Novosibirsk.

On 14 June 2019 he was signed by FC Rotor Volgograd. On 8 July he left Rotor.

Personal life
His father Lasha Verulidze has been a football referee at Russian second-tier since 2003.

References

External links
 
 Profile by Russian Football National League

1996 births
Russian people of Georgian descent
Living people
Russian footballers
Association football midfielders
FC SKA-Khabarovsk players
FC Fakel Voronezh players
FC Rotor Volgograd players
FC Guria Lanchkhuti players
FC Samgurali Tskaltubo players
Russian First League players
Russian Second League players
Erovnuli Liga players
Russian expatriate footballers
Expatriate footballers in Georgia (country)
FC Mashuk-KMV Pyatigorsk players